Chittilappilly  is a village in Thrissur district in the state of Kerala, India. It is a part of Adat Grama Panchayat, near its borders with Kaiparambu and Tholur Grama Panchayats.

Demographics
 India census, Chittilappilly had a population of 5768 with 2821 males and 2947 females.

Parappur Chittilappilly, is a family with roots in Parappur  (a small town in Thrissur).

IES public school and IES engineering college are the important educational institutions situated here.

References

Villages in Thrissur district